Calosphaeriaceae is a family of fungi in the order Calosphaeriales.

Genera
 Calosphaeria
 Calosphaeriophora
 Jattaea
 Kacosphaeria
 Pachytrype
 Phaeocrella
 Phragmocalosphaeria
 Togniniella
 Wegelina

External links

Ascomycota families
Calosphaeriales
Taxa named by Anders Munk
Taxa described in 1957